Golden West Broadcasting Ltd. is a Canadian radio and digital media company based in Altona, Manitoba. It is the largest independent radio broadcaster in Canada. The company primarily operates small-market radio stations and internet portals in the Prairie provinces of Alberta, Saskatchewan and Manitoba.

Radio stations

Other operations

On October 28, 2004, Canadian Satellite Radio announced a partnership with both Golden West Broadcasting and Rawlco Communications that would give the two broadcasting companies the option to acquire an ownership interest in CSR should its satellite radio application be approved by the CRTC.

In a press release for the announcement, Elmer Hildebrand, CEO of Golden West Broadcasting, stated:

"Satellite radio has the potential to deliver enormous positive impact to Canadians at all levels of this industry - musicians, artists, and listeners alike.  I am happy to participate in this application which I believe will have a positive impact on commercial radio, and given this technological development, it is important to license and regulate it in Canada expeditiously."

CSR's application and two others were approved on June 16, 2005; CSR's service, XM Radio Canada, launched on December 1, 2005.

Hildebrand owns three radio stations in the city of Saskatoon through Saskatoon Media Groupwhich are separate from Golden West.

In February 2021, the company acquired the Steinbach-based Summit Organizational Development.

References

External links

HOMEFIELD Marketing
Summit Organizational Development
History of Golden West Broadcasting Ltd. - Canadian Communications Foundation

 
Companies based in Manitoba